Wutong Ferry Terminal or Wutong Port is located on the North East coastline of Amoy island in the city of Xiamen, Fujian, China. It is a modern ferry terminal allowing hourly ferry services to the Taiwanese controlled Kinmen Island. It features immigration facilities and check-in services for Kinmen Airport allowing for seamless transfers between many cities in Taiwan and the Chinese mainland.

References

Buildings and structures in Xiamen
Transport in Fujian
Ferry terminals in China
Water transport in China